In Greek mythology, Praxander ( Praxandros, also Latinised as Praxandrus) was the founder, together with Cepheus, of Keryneia in Cyprus. He is mentioned in the poem Alexandra, attributed to Lycophron, as an Achaean, not from noble descent.

References

Ancient Achaeans
Mythological city founders
People from Achaea